Yasmine Salah El-Din Fouad Abdel Aziz is an Egyptian politician. She has been Minister of Environment in Mostafa Madbouly's ministry since 18 June 2018.

She will chair the 2022 United Nations Climate Change Conference in Sharm el-Sheikh.

References 

Living people
21st-century Egyptian women politicians
21st-century Egyptian politicians
Women government ministers of Egypt
Cairo University alumni
Year of birth missing (living people)